Mishio Ishimoto (September 17 1893 – February 4 1940) was a Japanese seismologist, doctor of Science. He was a professor at Tokyo Imperial University.

Mishio Ishimoto is from Tokyo.  After graduating from the Department of Physics, Tokyo Imperial University in 1917, he was the director of the Earthquake Research Institute. He studied such as consideration of the magma intrusion theory regarding the cause of earthquakes and the proposal of a push-cone shape regarding the P-wave initial distribution of seismic waves, Relational expression between maximum amplitude of ground motion and number of occurrences. He also invented Silica inclinometers etc. In 1933, he received the Imperial Academy Prize for his research on ground motion measurement.

References 

Japanese seismologists
University of Tokyo alumni
Academic staff of the University of Tokyo
People from Tokyo
Recipients of the Order of the Sacred Treasure, 3rd class
1893 births
1940 deaths